This is a list of the best-selling singles in 1995 in Japan, as reported by Oricon.

References

1995 in Japanese music
1995
Oricon
Japanese music-related lists